, also known as TVI, is a Japanese broadcast network affiliated with the Nippon News Network and Nippon Television Network System. Their headquarters are located in Morioka, Iwate Prefecture.

The Headquarters
2-10 Uchimaru Morioka, Iwate 020-8650 Japan
Telephone Number:+81-19-624-1166

History
1969 December 1: It was set up to become Iwate Prefecture's second broadcasting station.
2006 October 1: their Morioka Station started their first Digital terrestrial television broadcasts.

Stations

Analog 
Morioka(Main Station) 35ch

Digital(ID:4)
Morioka(Main Station) 18ch

Programs
5kigenTV
NEWS PLUS 1 IWATE

Rival Stations

Other Links
Television Iwate

Iwate Prefecture
Television stations in Japan
Nippon News Network
Television channels and stations established in 1969
Mass media in Morioka, Iwate